Jonny Labey (born 15 January 1993) is a British actor, known for portraying the role of Paul Coker on the BBC soap opera EastEnders.

Early life
Labey is from Grouville, Jersey. He attended Grouville School and Victoria College. He began dancing aged 5 and appeared in his first stage show aged 8 as part of the Jersey Amateur Dramatic Club. In 2011, he left Jersey to take a BA course at the Doreen Bird College of Performance in Sidcup, London, graduating in 2014. His cousin is fellow actor Philip Labey, known for starring as "Acorn" in various television advertisements for Oak Furnitureland alongside Stephen Critchlow in the mid-2010s.

Career
After graduating, Labey appeared in stage shows including In the Heights and White Christmas. He appeared in Leon Lopez's film Soft Lad. Labey joined the cast of EastEnders in 2015, in the role of Paul Coker, the grandson of Les Coker (Roger Sloman) and Pam Coker (Lin Blakley). The character falls in love with Ben Mitchell (Harry Reid), but was later killed off in a homophobic attack. Labey appeared in EastEnders between 1 June 2015 and 8 September 2016, appearing in 106 episodes. His first role after leaving EastEnders was as the lead character, Rupert Brooke, in the play Verge of Strife, staged in Edinburgh in August 2016. In 2017, he was a contestant on ITV's Dance Dance Dance. 

In October 2019, he began competing in The X Factor: Celebrity. He was given a safe seat along with Jenny Ryan and Try Star in week 1, but was eliminated in week 2 after landing in the bottom 2 with Martin Bashir as the result went to deadlock. He finished in tenth place. In 2022, he portrayed Jamie Renton in an episode of the BBC soap opera Doctors.

Filmography

Discography

Singles

As featured artist

Awards and nominations

References

External links

Living people
21st-century British male actors
British male soap opera actors
People from Grouville
Alumni of Bird College
Jersey male actors
People educated at Victoria College, Jersey
1993 births
British stage actors
British male film actors